Dragon Prince may refer to

 Dragon Prince, a 1988 novel by Melanie Rawn that starts the Dragon Prince and Dragon Star trilogies
 Dragon Prince (comics), a 2008 comic book miniseries by Ron Marz and Lee Moder
 The Dragon Prince, a 2018 Netflix fantasy television series
 Druk Gyalsey, Crown Prince of Bhutan, translated to 'Dragon Prince' in English. Currently held by Jigme Namgyel Wangchuck.
 Dragon King, in Chinese mythology

See also
The Dragon and the Prince, a Serbian fairy tale
Dragon Princess, a 1975 karate film